The Battle of Casaglia was a battle in the Neapolitan War. An Austrian force under the command of Johann Friedrich von Mohr engaged a Neapolitan force under their commander, Joachim Murat. The battle took place around the village of Casaglia, seven miles northwest of Ferrara, and resulted in the Austrians recapturing the village from Murat.

Battle 
After Murat was defeated at the Battle of Occhiobello, the Neapolitans stopped their advance and made a defensive line on the Po River. However, even from his new position, Murat was still able to threaten the key Austrian held city of Ferrara, which had been under attack since 7 April. The commander of the main Austrian force on the north bank of the Po, Johann Frimont, decided to break out from his bridgehead at Occhiobello and drive Murat from his position, forcing him to lift the Siege of Ferrara.

Murat had entrenched General Ambrosio's division on his right flank northwest of Ferrara, around the villages of Ravale and Casaglia.  The Neapolitan garrison of Ravale was quickly routed on the morning of 12 April. On the same day, an Austrian column under the command of General Mohr, attacked a larger Neapolitan force entrenched in Casaglia. Following severe fighting in the village, the Austrians eventually broke the morale of the defenders and drove the Neapolitans from their positions by the evening. The Neapolitans suffered severe casualties as they retreated. The remainder of the force fell back on the road to Bologna with a large number deserting Murat's cause altogether. Mirandola fell the following day to the Austrians without major fighting and Murat was forced to retire from his defensive position, finally pulling his troops back from Ferrara.

Citations

References

Further reading 
Capt. Batty, An Historical Sketch of the Campaign of 1815, London (1820)
Details of battle at Clash of Steel

External links 

Conflicts in 1815
Battles of the Neapolitan War
Battles involving Austria
Battles involving the Kingdom of Naples
1815 in Italy
1815 in the Austrian Empire
April 1815 events
Battles in Emilia-Romagna
Joachim Murat